Beate Edeltraud Peters (born 12 October 1959 in Marl, North Rhine-Westphalia) is a retired West German javelin thrower.

Biography
She finished seventh at the 1983 World Championships and the 1984 Summer Olympics. She then won bronze medals at the 1986 European Championships and the 1987 World Championships. She also participated at the 1988 Olympics, but did not reach the final.

She became West German champion in 1985 and 1986. She represented the clubs OSC Dortmund and TV Wattenscheid.

Her personal best throw was 69.56 metres with the old javelin type, achieved in July 1986 in Berlin. This ranks her tenth among German old-type-javelin throwers, behind Petra Felke (who held the world record), Antje Kempe, Silke Renk, Beate Koch, Karen Forkel, Tanja Damaske, Ruth Fuchs, Ingrid Thyssen and Susanne Jung.

Private life 
Beate Peters is openly lesbian and lives with retired heptathlete Sabine Braun.

Achievements

References

Footnotes

1959 births
Living people
Athletes (track and field) at the 1984 Summer Olympics
Athletes (track and field) at the 1988 Summer Olympics
West German female javelin throwers
Lesbian sportswomen
LGBT track and field athletes
German LGBT sportspeople
Olympic athletes of West Germany
People from Marl, North Rhine-Westphalia
Sportspeople from Münster (region)
World Athletics Championships medalists
European Athletics Championships medalists
Universiade medalists in athletics (track and field)
Universiade gold medalists for West Germany
Medalists at the 1983 Summer Universiade
21st-century LGBT people